The 2012 Renfrewshire Council election took place on 3 May 2012 to elect members of Renfrewshire Council. The election used the eleven wards created as a result of the Local Governance (Scotland) Act 2004, with each ward electing three or four Councillors using the single transferable vote system a form of proportional representation, with 40 Councillors being elected.

The election saw the Scottish Labour Party gain five seats to regain an overall majority on the council that they had lost at the time of the 2007 Local Elections, while also significantly increasing their vote. The Scottish National Party remained in second place on the council but recorded a disappointing performance as the party lost two seats and saw a slight drop in its vote share. Both the Scottish Conservative and Unionist Party and the Scottish Liberal Democrats declined in numbers to just one seat each. Meanwhile, Independent and former Labour Party member, Paul Mack, secured a seat on the council.

Following the election the Labour majority administration was formed. This replaced the previous SNP – Lib Dem coalition that had existed from 2007 to 2012.

Election result

Note: "Votes" are the first preference votes. The net gain/loss and percentage changes relate to the result of the previous Scottish local elections on 3 May 2007. This may differ from other published sources showing gain/loss relative to seats held at dissolution of Scotland's councils.

Ward results

Renfrew North
2007: 2xSNP; 1xLab
2012: 2xLab; 1xSNP
2007-2012 Change: Lab gain one seat from SNP

Renfrew South and Gallowhill 
2007: 2xLab; 1xSNP
2012: 2xLab; 1xSNP
2007-2012 Change: No change

Paisley East and Ralston
2007: 2xSNP; 1xLib Dem; 1xLab 
2012: 2xLab; 2xSNP
2007-2012 Change: Lab gain one seat from Lib Dem

Paisley North West
2007: 2xLab; 1xSNP; 1xLib Dem
2012: 2xLab; 2xSNP
2007-2012 Change: SNP gain from Lib Dem

Paisley South
2007: 2xSNP; 1xLab; 1xLib Dem
2012: 2xLab; 1xSNP; 1xIndependent
2007-2012 Change: Lab and Independent gain one seat from SNP and Lib Dem

Paisley South West
2007: 2xLab; 1xSNP; 1xLib Dem
2012: 2xLab; 1xSNP; 1xLib Dem
2007-2012 Change: No change

Johnstone South, Elderslie and Howwood
2007: 3xLab; 1xSNP
2012: 3xLab; 1xSNP
2007-2012 Change: No change

Johnstone North, Kilbarchan and Lochwinnoch
2007: 2xSNP; 1xLab
2012: 2xLab; 1xSNP
2007-2012 Change: Lab gain one seat from SNP

Houston, Crosslee and Linwood
2007: 2xSNP; 1xLab; 1xCon
2012: 2xLab; 2xSNP
2007-2012 Change: Lab gain one seat from Con

Bishopton, Bridge of Weir and Langbank
2007: 1xCon; 1xSNP; 1xLab
2012: 1xLab; 1xCon; 1xSNP
2007-2012 Change: No change

Erskine and Inchinnan
2007: 2xLab; 2xSNP
2012: 2xLab; 2xSNP
2007-2012 Change: No change

Post-Election Changes
† Renfrew South and Gallowhill Labour Cllr Eddie Grady died on 23 May 2016. A by-election was held on 11 August 2016 and the seat was won by the SNP's Jim Paterson.

By-election since 2012

References 

 https://web.archive.org/web/20120511014144/http://www.renfrewshire.gov.uk/ilwwcm/publishing.nsf/Content/Navigation-cs-ElectionResultsLGHomePage

2012
2012 Scottish local elections